St Clare's is a coeducational private, international day and boarding college in North Oxford, England offering the International Baccalaureate Diploma, a Preparatory IB  programme, English language courses, University Pathways, Gap Year study and IB teacher training workshops.

Courses for adults include the University Foundation Programme, English language courses, English with Academic Subjects and Undergraduate Programme for Gap Year students. In the spring and summer months, adults, teenagers and juniors can study English language courses on three separate sites.

The school is consistently listed in the Top 20 IB Schools in the UK School League Tables from Education Advisers Ltd.

History
The school was founded in 1952 by Anne Dreydel OBE and Pamela Morris, and grew out of a scheme to establish links between British and European students after the Second World War. Its mission is to advance international education and understanding.

The original name was The Oxford English Centre for Foreign Students, which later became St Clare's Hall, and then St Clare's, Oxford.

Since 1953 the College grew to encompass a wide range of nationalities and programmes, both at university and pre-university level and in English Language.  In the mid-50s, students came mostly from around a dozen Western European countries, as well as the UK.  Over 40 different nationalities are represented in its current IB student body.

Links with universities in the USA date back to the 1960s.  Formal agreements by which American university students could gain credit towards their US degrees by studying abroad at St Clare's started up in the 1970s.  Such courses gradually replaced the University of London external degrees that had previously been taught.

In 1977 the College introduced the International Baccalaureate Diploma for pre-university students – only the 41st school in the world to do so. There are only 13 other institutions in the world who have taught the IB longer than St Clare's. "A" levels were gradually phased out as the IB became established, and the College is now the longest established IB school in England (source ISA).  There are currently over 3,700 IB world schools.

The College campus has grown with the increase in student numbers.  As a registered charity, profits are re-invested in the College to facilitate expansion and development.  From its original base on 141 Banbury Road, the College grew to allow more teaching space and a wider range of subject choices.  Early homestay arrangements were largely replaced with residential accommodation, as new houses in the area were acquired and refurbished.  In 1999, the College bought the Oxford Academy English Language School in Bardwell Road, which became the centre for all adult courses.

The main campus building and reception is located at 139 Banbury Road, in the Summertown suburb of North Oxford.

The college has completed a number of significant building projects including a new £1.3 million student residence for 24 students and wardens apartments in 2010; a £3.4 million building housing 3 science laboratories and 3 Mathematics classrooms in 2014; and an art studio and student residence in the grounds of one of the existing student houses in 2015.

Campus
St Clare's is located in the North Oxford Conservation Area on two sites – the Banbury Road Campus (No. 139, between Lathbury Road and Moreton Road) and the Bardwell Road Campus (No. 18). It occupies 25 Victorian and Edwardian houses to which purpose-built facilities have been added. At the Banbury Road Campus these include a library building, a careers and higher education information centre, four science laboratories completed in 2014, an art studio completed in 2015 and music studio, dining room and café. Adult students are based at the International College located at the Bardwell Road Campus which is made up of classrooms, common room, dining room, activities office, gardens and student bedrooms.

Students live in college houses close to the college, under the care of residential staff. Adult students can also choose to live with hosts in Oxford.

International Baccalaureate
St Clare's is a co-educational day and residential sixth form college. It is an IB World School and the longest-established provider of the International Baccalaureate Diploma in England. It has been offering the International Baccalaureate Diploma for over 40 years. Over 150 different nationalities are represented and around 15% of the students are from the UK.

St Clare's also offers the Pre-IB course. The Pre-IB course has entry points in September, January or April. During the Summer, IB Introduction and IB revision courses are available. The college is authorised to run IB Teacher Workshops for both new and experienced teachers in co-operation with the International Baccalaureate Organisation (IBO).

In the most recent Ofsted inspection of the IB World School, St Clare's was awarded "outstanding", the highest rating, for the quality of its boarding.

St Clare's offers a range of languages to study at A1 Literature level. Students must study 6 subjects, 3 at Higher Level and 3 at Standard Level. Every student must study one subject from Groups 1 - 5. The sixth subject option can be chosen either from group 6 or from one of the previous groups.

Extra-curricular activities

St Clare's offers over 50 creativity, activity and service experiences per week as part of the CAS component of the IB course, including:
 Art club
 Boys' basketball
 Boys' football
 Chess club
 Clarity magazine
 Duke of Edinburgh Award
 Girls' football
 Model United Nations
 Photography club
 St Clare's Union
 Student council
 Table Tennis
 Theatre club

English Language courses
A range of adult English Language courses are run throughout the academic year from September to June. Courses run from 2 weeks to one academic year; 21 or 25 lessons per week, as well as one-to-one tuition. Courses include English for Life, English for Examinations (which covers IELTS and Cambridge examination preparation) and English plus Academic Subjects. There is also the option to take Personal Language Training.

Students who wish to apply to university in the UK, USA and Europe can take the 28/35-week University Foundation Programme.

Students with advanced level English are able to study a programme which combines English language classes with academic subjects taught at university level. These academic subjects are a part of the Undergraduate Programme. This course is for students who wish to take a Gap Year as part of their US degree, build their academic literacies for further study or learn a new academic subject.

University Foundation Programme
Many students who wish to apply to UK universities choose the University Foundation Programme, an in-depth preparation for university entrance, from September to June for 35 weeks or late October to June for 28 weeks. There is also a January entry option. St Clare's also offers a Pre-Foundation Programme who students who would like to develop their language and study skills before the University Foundation Programme. In summer 2021, the college was awarded "exceeds expectation" by the Independent Schools Inspectorate Educational Oversight for Private Further Education Colleges in its Inspection Report.

Summer courses
Shorter English Language courses from 2 weeks up to 6 weeks during the Spring and Summer. These short holiday courses combine English classes with an activities and excursions programme. Students live in college accommodation or with local hosts. St Clare's offer courses for adults (17+ years old), teenagers age (15–17 years old) and juniors (10–15 years old). For teenagers with an advanced level of English there are three more academic-style courses; Art and Digital Design in Oxford (using the new art studio built in 2015), Business in Oxford and Science in Oxford (using the new science laboratories built in 2014) and Fantasy Literature in Oxford.

Notable former pupils

 Andrea Agnelli, Businessman and Chairman of Italian football club Juventus F.C.
Ariane Mnouchkine, Stage Director
 Cristina Odone, Journalist, editor, and writer
 Deborah Warner, Director of theatre and opera
Katharina Otto-Bernstein, German-American filmmaker, billionaire heiress to the Otto GmbH fortune
 Princess Salha bint Asem of Jordan
 Ragnar Tørnquist, Game designer and author
 Renaud Camus, Writer
 Roger Lambart, 13th Earl of Cavan
 Sally Brampton, Journalist, writer, and magazine editor
Tom Adams, Entrepreneur

References

External links
 St Clare's, Oxford website

Memberships 

Blackfriars Oxford 
 British Council
 English UK 
Independent Schools Association  
Independent Schools Council - ISC  
 Independent Schools Inspectorate – Integrated and Intermediate (Boarding) 
International Association of Languages Centres (IALC)
International Baccalaureate Organization  
 Private Further Education - PFE
Quality English and Quality Education
The University of San Diego 

Educational institutions established in 1953
1953 establishments in England
Private schools in Oxfordshire
Schools in Oxford
International Baccalaureate schools in England
International schools in England
Educational charities based in the United Kingdom
Member schools of the Independent Schools Association (UK)